Patti LuPone is an American actress and singer best known for her work in stage musicals and her appearances in film and television. She has won two Grammy Awards, three Tony Awards, and two Olivier Awards.

LuPone has received eight Tony Award nominations for her work on the Broadway stage winning three times for Tony Award for Best Actress in a Musical for her roles in Evita in 1980, for Gypsy in 2008, and for Company in 2022. She also received two Grammy Awards in 2008 for Best Classical Album and Best Opera Recording for Welli: Rise and Fall of the City of Mahagonny. For her work on the London stage she won two Laurence Olivier Awards for Best Actress in a Musical for Les Misérables / Cradle Will Rock in 1985 and Best Actress in a Supporting Role in a Musical for Company in 2019. She also received eight Drama Desk Award nominations, winning four times for Evita, Anything Goes, Gypsy, and Company, and six Outer Critics Circle Award nominations, winning three times for Patti LuPone on Broadway, Gypsy, and Company. For her work on television she received a Primetime Emmy Award nomination for Outstanding Guest Actress in a Comedy Series for her performance in Frasier. She also received a Daytime Emmy Award nomination for Outstanding Performer in Children's Programming for Song Spinner.

Major associations

Tony Awards

Grammy Awards

Emmy Awards

Theatre awards

Laurence Olivier Awards

Drama Desk Awards

Outer Critics Circle Award

Miscellaneous awards

References 

LuPone, Patti